The 1986 Giro d'Italia was the 69th edition of the Giro d'Italia, one of cycling's Grand Tours. The field consisted of 171 riders, and 143 riders finished the race.

By rider

By nationality

References

1986 Giro d'Italia
1986